Jeremy Wall is a musician, and along with Jay Beckenstein, was a founding member of the jazz fusion band Spyro Gyra.  He contributed to the group as a pianist, producer, and composer. He is currently an assistant professor in the Music Industry department at SUNY Oneonta.

Background
Wall formed Spyro Gyra in the mid-1970s with classmate Jay Beckenstein. Although each took time off to attend college, the band stayed intact. Wall attended Columbia University, then moved to Buffalo where Beckenstein was attending college. Wall then moved to California to attend California Institute of the Arts, graduating with a B.F.A. in Music Composition. He later received an M.M. in Studio Composition from Purchase College in 2001. He has recorded extensively as producer, keyboardist, composer and arranger in all genres of music and has released over 70 of his own compositions.  Wall has also been nominated for several Grammys as a producer, pianist and composer.  His composition “Shakedown” was nominated for a Grammy award for “Best Pop Instrumental.”  He was the featured soloist at the Shenandoah Bach Festival in 2004.

Wall worked as an adjunct professor at both Ramapo and Purchase College before joining SUNY Oneonta, where he teaches courses relating to contemporary issues in the music industry and songwriting. He also leads the jazz funk band. These classes draw upon Wall's history with Spyro Gyra and his experience in the music industry.

Currently
Wall, along with the SUNY Oneonta Funk Band ensemble, often plays music on campus and in the surrounding area.

Discography
 Cool Running (Amherst, 1991)
 Stepping Into the New World (Amherst, 1992)

With Spyro Gyra
 1978 Spyro Gyra
 1979 Morning Dance
 1980 Catching the Sun
 1980 Carnaval
 1981 Freetime
 1982 Incognito
 1983 City Kids
 1984 Access All Areas
 1985 Alternating Currents
 1986 Breakout
 1987 Stories Without Words
 1988 Rites of Summer
 1989 Point of View
 1990 Fast Forward
 1992 Three Wishes
 1993 Dreams Beyond Control
 1995 Love and Other Obsessions
 1996 Heart of the Night
 1997 20/20

With Richard Stoltzman
 1991 Brasil
 1991 Begin Sweet World
 1992 Hark!
 1995 Visions
 1994 Dreams
 1996 Spirits
 1998 Danza Latina
 1998 Open Sky
 2000 World Beat Bach

With others
 1979 In a Temple Garden, Yusef Lateef (CTI)
 1980 Body Language, Patti Austin
 1989 The Complete Recordings, Fuse One
 1996 Imagine, Ofra Harnoy

References

External links
SUNY Oneonta Music Department Bio

Year of birth missing (living people)
American music educators
California Institute of the Arts alumni
State University of New York at Purchase alumni
Jazz fusion pianists
American jazz pianists
American male pianists
American jazz composers
American male jazz composers
Record producers from New York (state)
Place of birth missing (living people)
Living people
State University of New York at Oneonta faculty
Jazz musicians from New York (state)
21st-century American pianists
21st-century American male musicians
Spyro Gyra members